, also known as just Canvas 2, is a Japanese visual novel developed by F&C FC01, a brand of F&C, released for Windows on April 23, 2004. The game was later ported to the PlayStation 2 by Kadokawa Shoten, on January 26, 2006. AiCherry produced a DVD Player Game version of Canvas 2 on November 28, 2008. An iOS version was released on January 12, 2013. A fan disc called Innocent Colors ~Canvas 2 Fan Disc~ was released for Windows on September 24, 2004. The game is a sequel to Canvas ~Sepia-iro no Motif~. Two other spin off games part of the Canvas series were released by F&C.

A 24-episode anime television series called  was produced by studio Zexcs, and licensed by Kadokawa Pictures USA in North America. It aired on eight different channels in Japan between October 3, 2005, and March 27, 2006, and was streamed on Crunchyroll. Two manga adaptations were published by Kadokawa Shoten, and three light novels have also been published, as well as multiple drama CDs.

Gameplay

Canvas 2 is a visual novel in which the player assumes the role of Hiroki Kamikura. Much of its gameplay is spent reading the text that appears on the screen, which represents the story's narrative and dialogue. The text is accompanied by character sprites, which represent who Hiroki is talking to, over background art. Throughout the game, the player encounters CG artwork at certain points in the story, which take the place of the background art and character sprites. Canvas 2 follows a branching plot line with multiple endings, and depending on the decisions that the player makes during the game, the plot will progress in a specific direction.

There are seven main plot lines that the player will have the chance to experience, one for each of the heroines in the story. Throughout gameplay, the player is given multiple options to choose from, and text progression pauses at these points until a choice is made. Some decisions can lead the game to end prematurely and offer an alternative ending to the plot. To view all plot lines in their entirety, the player will have to replay the game multiple times and choose different choices to further the plot to an alternate direction. Throughout gameplay, there are scenes depicting Hiroki and a given heroine having sexual intercourse, except in the PlayStation 2 and iOS versions, where these scenes cannot be viewed.

Plot
The series focuses on the lives of some students and teachers at Nadesico Academy both at school and their private lives. The main character of the series is Kamikura Hiroki, who lives with his younger cousin Elis. Hiroki is training to become a full-fledged art teacher while also trying to take care of Elis. When his childhood friend Kiri starts working at the school, drama begins to flare as he has to juggle his work, private life, and the feelings for these two important girls.

Characters

Nadesico staff

 (anime)
He is the older cousin of Elis as well as her current guardian.

Childhood friend of Hiroki as well as a Physical Education teacher at Nadesico Academy.

She is the acting superintendent at Nadesico Academy.

Students

Elis is a freshman at Nadesico Academy. Her parents died in a car accident and she was left in the foster care of her cousin, Kamikura Hiroki.

Despite her short stature, Hagino is actually a sophomore at Nadesico Academy.

 (PC), Mikako Takahashi (PS2, anime)
Elis' classmate. She has a medical problem concerning her heart, and is often absent from school.

The president of the art club at Nadesico Academy.

Youngest daughter of a family of great musicians.

 (PS2, anime)
One of Elis’s classmates.

Other characters

Voiced by: Kaeru Haruno (PC), Miho Miyakawa (PS2, anime)
She is Kana’s editor and is constantly pressuring her to finish within writing deadlines.

 (PS2, anime)
Childhood friend of Hiroki and Kiri.

Theme songs

PC Game
Opening
Plastic Smile(^^ by A BONE featuring YURIA

Ending
Hibi by Rena

PlayStation 2/DVDPG version
Opening
Blue Sky by Honey Bee (YURIA)

Ending
Primary Memory by Sweets Tankentai

Anime
 Opening
  Plastic Smile (Niji Iro Guiter VERSION) by Honey Bee (YURIA)

 Ending
 NA NA IRO by Sweets Tankentai

Adaptations

Light novels
The first light novel was published by Enterbrain on July 30, 2004, under their Famitsu Bunko imprint. It was written by Izumi Okazaki, and illustrated by Fumio. A light novel series written by Tooru Tamegai and illustrated by Naru Nanao, spanning two volumes, was published by Kadokawa Shoten between December 21, 2005 and March 25, 2006. The first volume is titled Canvas 2 ~Niji Iro no Sketch~ Before RED, and the second volume is titled Canvas 2 ~Niji Iro no Sketch~ Beyond RED.

Manga
The first manga adaptation of Canvas 2, titled Canvas 2 Extra Season, illustrated by Miki Kodama, was serialized in Kadokawa Shoten's Monthly Ace Next magazine (later switching to Monthly Shōnen Ace magazine) between September 2004, and December 2005 issues. Five chapters were collected into a single tankōbon volume. The second manga adaptation of Canvas 2 was serialized in the Monthly Shōnen Ace magazine from April 2005 to September 2006, and later switched to the Comp Ace magazine. The series was authored and illustrated by Miki Kodama. Four tankōbon volumes were published by Kadokawa Shoten.

Drama CDs
Drama CDs based on the game have been produced. Firstly, a drama CD titled Canvas2 Indian Summer ~Chiisana Usotsuki~ Raspberry Original Drama was published by Raspberry on April 23, 2004. It consists of one disc containing five tracks. The second drama CD, titled Canvas2 Drama CD - Prism Iro no Summer Festa, was published by Marine Entertainment on October 29, 2004. It consists of one disc containing four tracks. The third drama CD, titled Canvas2 Drama CD - Rhapsody de Noel, was published by Headquarter on February 20, 2005. It consists of one disc containing eight tracks. Three more drama CDs were published, the first one of these being a drama CD called Canvas2 Extra Season Drama CD, published by Kadokawa Shoten on January 26, 2006. It contains one single track which is fifty minutes and six seconds long. The next drama CD was published by Elements Garden on May 26, 2006, titled Canvas2 Drama CD ~First KISS wa, Nani iro?~. It consists of one disc containing six tracks. The last drama CD, titled Canvas2 DVD EDITION Drama CD ~Seven Color Party = Surprise!~, was published by Elements Garden on December 29, 2006. It consists of one disc containing ten tracks.

Spin off games
Canvas 2: Akane Iro no Palette itself is a spin-off of Canvas ~Sepia-iro no Motif~, a visual novel first released for the PC by a subsidiary of F&C, called Cocktail Soft on November 24, 2000. Interchannel released a Dreamcast version of the game on April 5, 2001. The game was later ported to the PlayStation 2 on April 10, 2003 by Interchannel. Canvas ~Sepia-iro no Motif~ was also released for the iOS on June 6, 2013. An original video animation (OVA) series has been produced by TripleX, Studio Kyuuma, and Lemon Heart, the two OVA episodes were released in Japan on December 25, 2001.

The first sequel to Canvas 2: Akane Iro no Palette (not including the fan disc) is Canvas 3 ~Hakugin no Portrait~, a PC game released by F&C on March 20, 2009. Piacci released a PlayStation 2 port of the game on September 17, 2009, and then a PlayStation Portable version of Canvas 3 was released on April 22, 2010. On July 24, 2012, an Android version was produced, and an iOS version was produced on June 14, 2013. A novel series, and manga adaptation have been published. Also, a fan disc for Canvas 3 called Valentine Pink was released for PC on April 23, 2010.

Lastly, a visual novel called Canvas 4 ~Achrome Etude~ was released for the PC on January 28, 2011 by F&C. GN Software released Canvas 4 for PlayStation Portable on November 23, 2011. A manga adaptation for Canvas 4 was published by Akita Shoten.

Anime

A 24-episode anime television series directed by Itsuro Kawasaki and written Reiko Yoshida, called Canvas 2 ~Niji Iro no Sketch~, was produced by studio Zexcs, and aired on the networks Chiba TV, TV Saitama, TV Kanagawa, KBS, Sun TV, TV Aichi, Perfect Choice, and AT-X in Japan from October 3, 2005, to March 27, 2006. The anime was simulcast on Crunchyroll, along with two other titles, Venus to Mamoru and Macademi. The anime was licensed in North America by Kadokawa Pictures USA. Episodes in the anime are named after colors.

References

External links
 Canvas 2 at Kadokawa Shoten 
 
 

2004 video games
Bishōjo games
DVD interactive technology
Eroge
Famitsu Bunko
IOS games
Japan-exclusive video games
Kadokawa Shoten manga
Manga based on video games
PlayStation 2 games
Romance anime and manga
Seinen manga
Video games developed in Japan
Visual novels
Windows games
Zexcs